Shirley Mason may refer to:

 Shirley Ardell Mason (1923–1998), American psychiatric patient
 Shirley Mason (actress) (1900–1979), American silent film actress

See also
Shirley Manson (born 1966), Scottish musician and actress